The Occitan alphabet consists of the following 23 Latin letters:

{|class="wikitable" style="border-collapse:collapse;"
|- 	 
|bgcolor="#EFEFEF" align="center" colspan="26" | Majuscule forms (also called uppercase or capital letters)
|-
|width=3% align="center"|A||width=3% align="center"|B||width=3% align="center"|C||width=3% align="center"|D||width=3% align="center"|E||width=3% align="center"|F||width=3% align="center"|G||width=3% align="center"|H||width=3% align="center"|I||width=3% align="center"|J||width=3% align="center"|L||width=3% align="center"|M||width=3% align="center"|N||width=3% align="center"|O||width=3% align="center"|P||width=3% align="center"|Q||width=3% align="center"|R||width=3% align="center"|S||width=3% align="center"|T||width=3% align="center"|U||width=3% align="center"|V||width=3% align="center"|X||width=3% align="center"|Z
|- 	
|align="center" colspan="26" | Minuscule forms (also called lowercase or small letters)
|-
|align="center"|a||align="center"|b||align="center"|c||align="center"|d||align="center"|e||align="center"|f||align="center"|g||align="center"|h||align="center"|i||align="center"|j||align="center"|l||align="center"|m||align="center"|n||align="center"|o||align="center"|p||align="center"|q||align="center"|r||align="center"|s||align="center"|t||align="center"|u||align="center"|v||align="center"|x||align="center"|z
|}

The letters K, W and Y are considered foreign by Occitanians and are used only in words of foreign origin, incrementally integrated into Occitan, such as whisky, watt, Kenya.  They may be included in the Occitan alphabet following the order in the international alphabet.

Letter names

The letter names are usually feminine.

Elision is common before a letter starting with a vowel.

Diacritics

Several diacritics serve to modify the pronunciation of the letters of the Occitan alphabet.
 The grave accent _̀ found on à, è, ò.
 The acute accent _́ found on á, é, í, ó, ú.
 The diaeresis ¨ found on ï, ü.
 The cedilla ¸ found under ç.
 The interpunct · found between two consecutive consonants: n·h and s·h. In the Middle Ages, the interpunct was common throughout Aquitania (see Old Occitan).

The diacritics are required on the capitals.

Sound-to-spelling correspondences

Unless noted, regional IPA values are the same as Standard Occitan. Despite being listed as dialect of Occitan, Gascon are listed as separate language here and it is excluded from this list.

Consonants

Vowels

See also
 Occitan conjugation
 Occitan language
 Occitan phonology

References

External links
 Omniglot
 http://www.orbilat.com/Languages/Occitan/Grammar/Occitan-Alphabet.html

Occitan
Alphabet